Geoffrey Robert Reece (born May 16, 1952) is a former professional American football player, a center who played in three NFL seasons from 1976–1978 for the Los Angeles Rams, Seattle Seahawks, and Baltimore Colts.

Born and raised in Everett, Washington, Reece graduated from its Cascade High School, and played college football at Washington State University in Pullman under head coach Jim Sweeney. 
He was all-conference twice in the Pacific-8, and All-American as a senior. After the 1974 season, Reece played in the Blue-Gray Game, East-West Shine Game, and the Senior Bowl. He was inducted into the WSU athletics hall of fame in 2015.

Selected in the third round of the 1975 NFL Draft by the Rams, a knee injury in the College All-Star Game on August 1 sidelined Reece for his rookie season in 1975.

References

External links

1952 births
American football centers
Baltimore Colts players
Living people
Los Angeles Rams players
Sportspeople from Everett, Washington
Seattle Seahawks players
Washington State Cougars football players